Heinz Dieter Eßmann is a German politician of the Christian Democratic Union (CDU) and former member of the German Bundestag.

Life 
In 1966 Eßmann joined the CDU. He was also chairman of the city association of the CDU in Wolfenbüttel. There he was a member of the city council from 1972 and mayor from 1974 to 1996. He was also a member of the district council from 1968 to 1996. From 1994 to 1998, Eßmann sat in the German Bundestag. He was elected via the Lower Saxony state list.

Daughter: in Sweden 
Annicki (Kicki) Eßmann 

Grandchildren: in Sweden 
Nicki Eßmann
Daniela Minou Nordmark
Nathalie Nordmark
Melissa Nordmark

References 

1938 births
Living people
Members of the Bundestag for Lower Saxony
Members of the Bundestag 1994–1998
Members of the Bundestag for the Christian Democratic Union of Germany